Kim Song-suk (born 12 February 1966) is a North Korean figure skater. She competed in the ladies' singles event at the 1988 Winter Olympics.

References

1966 births
Living people
North Korean female single skaters
Olympic figure skaters of North Korea
Figure skaters at the 1988 Winter Olympics
Place of birth missing (living people)